The Way It Is...Live! is a concert film by Snowy White and his band The White Flames, recorded during a 2004 tour, and released in 2005. It features a promotional video of Peter Green's "Black Magic Woman". Originally edited as a DVD, a bonus audio CD includes the complete concert.

Track listing
All songs by Snowy White, except where noted.

 "No Stranger to the Blues" (Snowy White, Gil Marais-Gilchrist) – 3:57
 "What I'm Searching For" – 6:24
 "Little Wing" (Jimi Hendrix) – 5:24
 "Blues Is the Road" – 4:44
 "I Loved Another Woman" (Peter Green) – 4:47
 "The Answer" – 2:56
 "Land of Plenty" – 6:42
 "Lucky Star" – 5:19
 "Terpisah" (Walter Latupeirissa) – 7:35
 "Working Blues" – 6:14
 "Angel Inside You, Part I & II" – 12:28
 "This Time of My Life" – 3:41
 "A Piece of Your Love" – 4:12
 "Black Magic Woman" (Green)

Personnel
Snowy White – guitars, vocals.
Walter Latupeirissa – bass guitar, vocals.
Max Middleton – Hammond organ, keyboards, piano, vocals.
Richard Bailey – drums, percussion.

References

Snowy White albums
Concert films
Live video albums
2005 live albums
2005 video albums